Boken till Dig is a book of poetry published in 1983 by the Swedish artist Jan Widströmer. The book combines Widströmer's poems with his artwork.

Widströmer emphasizes that "Boken till dig" is more than an illustrated collection of poems - it is more of a "poetical whole". The drawings and the poems go hand-in-hand and together they form a continuity and a combined experience which goes further than the individual piece of artwork.

The drawings as well as the poems are influenced by nature, life, death and love. The poems could be characterized as "haikuish" - that is short and powerful, often meditative, usually with multiple possible interpretations. It is up to the reader/beholder to make his own interpretation of the poems and the artwork.

References

Swedish poetry collections